Lilit Karapetyan (born 16 July 1992) is an Armenian professional footballer. She currently plays for Armenia women's national football team.

See also
List of Armenia women's international footballers

References

External links
Profile at UEFA.com

1992 births
Living people
Armenian women's footballers
Armenia women's international footballers
Women's association football forwards